Solipsism syndrome refers to a psychological state in which a person feels that reality is not external to their mind. Periods of extended isolation may predispose people to this condition. In particular, the syndrome has been identified as a potential concern for individuals living in outer space for extended periods of time.

Overview 

The philosophical definition of solipsism is the idea that only one's mind is sure to exist. In a solipsistic position, a person only believes their mind or self is sure to exist. This is part of self-existence theory or the view of the self. Solipsism as a belief is about the self perceiving the world as what the self believes the world is.

Individuals experiencing solipsism syndrome feel reality is not 'real' in the sense of being external to their own minds. The syndrome is characterized by feelings of loneliness, detachment and indifference to the outside world. Solipsism syndrome is not currently recognized as a psychiatric disorder by the American Psychiatric Association, though it shares similarities with depersonalization disorder, which is recognized. Solipsism syndrome is distinct from solipsism, which is a philosophical position that nothing exists or can be known to exist outside of one's own mind rather than a psychological state. Advocates of this philosophy do not necessarily suffer from solipsism syndrome, and sufferers do not necessarily subscribe to solipsism as a school of intellectual thought. 

Periods of extended isolation may predispose people to solipsism syndrome. In particular, the syndrome has been identified as a potential challenge for astronauts and cosmonauts on long-term missions,
and these concerns influence the design of artificial habitats.

See also
Anomie
Brain in a vat
Derealization
Existential crisis
Problem of other minds
Narcissistic personality disorder

References

External links
  NASA's Space Settlements: A Design Study Appendix A
 Is Reality Real? Help for Solipsism Syndrome sufferers

Psychopathological syndromes
Mental states